Ivan Georgiev Turitsov (born 18 July 1999) is a Bulgarian professional footballer who plays as a defender for CSKA Sofia.

Career
After progressing through the youth system at Litex Lovech, Turitsov joined CSKA Sofia's academy in July 2016, aged 17. In April 2017, after impressing with the U19 squad, he was promoted to the CSKA Sofia II. On 30 April 2017, Turitsov made his senior debut, playing full 90 minutes in a 2–3 home loss against Etar in the Second League.

In July 2017, Turitsov was loaned back to Litex Lovech to gain experience as a first-team player. He made his debut on 22 July 2017 in a 2–0 home win against Strumska Slava and amassed 36 league appearances over one and a half seasons.

After a successful loan spell with Litex, Turitsov officially returned to CSKA on 15 February 2019. He made his First League debut four days later, in a 2–1 home win against Botev Vratsa.

International career
Turitsov made his debut for the Bulgarian under-21 team on 22 March 2019 in the starting eleven for the friendly against Northern Ireland U21. He earned his first cap for the senior side on 26 February 2020, playing the full 90 minutes of the 0:1 home loss against Belarus in a friendly game.

Career statistics

Club
As of 26 February 2023

International

Honours
CSKA Sofia
 Bulgarian Cup: 2020–21

References

External links

Living people
1999 births
Bulgarian footballers
Bulgaria youth international footballers
Association football defenders
PFC Litex Lovech players
PFC CSKA Sofia players
First Professional Football League (Bulgaria) players
Sportspeople from Pleven